David Adeolu Adekola (born 18 May 1968) is a Nigerian former professional footballer who played for various English clubs in the 1990s and 2000s.

Club career
Adekola was born in Lagos. He joined Bury in January 1993, amid claims that he had played top-flight football in France and Belgium, although it later transpired that his entire international background was untrue. He joined Exeter City on loan in February 1994 and left Bury to join AFC Bournemouth on a free transfer in September 1994. A month later he joined Wigan Athletic, but played only four times before being released in February 1995. He joined Halifax Town, playing twice in the Conference. He had a brief spell with Hereford United before joining Bath City in March 1995, where he scored 3 goals from 9 games in all competitions.

He joined Cambridge United in July 1995, but once more struggled to establish himself and was loaned to Bishop's Stortford. Released by Cambridge in December 1995, Adekola moved to Germany to play for BFC Preussen and Viktoria Köln.

He returned to English football in October 1996 when he signed for Brighton & Hove Albion. He played just once for Brighton, in a 2–1 defeat at home to Cambridge United on 12 October, before being released the following month.

In July 1998 he joined Billericay Town, moving to Slough Town in August 1999. He joined Hendon during the 2000–01 season.

In May 2005, Adekola finished runner-up (to Craig Madden) in a vote for Bury's Cult Hero organised by the BBC show Football Focus.

International career
Adekola played for Nigeria's youth side at the 1987 FIFA World Youth Championship in Chile. He also played for the senior Nigeria national football team, scoring on goal on his debut in a 1990 African Cup of Nations qualifier against Guinea in 1989.

References

External links

1968 births
Living people
Nigerian footballers
Nigeria under-20 international footballers
Nigeria international footballers
Association football forwards
Bury F.C. players
Exeter City F.C. players
AFC Bournemouth players
Wigan Athletic F.C. players
Billericay Town F.C. players
Halifax Town A.F.C. players
Hereford United F.C. players
Bath City F.C. players
Cambridge United F.C. players
Bishop's Stortford F.C. players
FC Viktoria Köln players
BFC Preussen players
Brighton & Hove Albion F.C. players
Slough Town F.C. players
Hendon F.C. players
English Football League players
National League (English football) players
Yoruba sportspeople
Sportspeople from Lagos
Expatriate footballers in England
Nigerian expatriate footballers
Nigerian expatriate sportspeople in Germany
Nigerian expatriate sportspeople in the United Kingdom
Expatriate footballers in Germany